Myron Just (born 1941) is a North Dakota politician and farmer who served as the North Dakota Commissioner of Agriculture from 1974 to 1980, and in the North Dakota Senate from 1971 to 1973. He farmed near Berlin, North Dakota. He currently resides in the Minneapolis/St. Paul area.

Just was a Lieutenant Governor candidate during the 1980 election, but failed to secure the North Dakota Democratic-NPL nomination.

Notes

1941 births
Living people
North Dakota Commissioners of Agriculture
North Dakota state senators
People from LaMoure County, North Dakota